Beautiful Days may refer to:

 Beautiful Days (festival), an annual music festival in Devon, England
 "Beautiful Days" (song), a song by Japanese boy-band Arashi
 Beautiful Days (TV series), a 2001 South Korean television drama series
 Beautiful Days (album), a 2006 album by Kyla
 Beautiful Days (film), a 2018 South Korean film

See also
 Beautiful Day (disambiguation)